Edward C. Notbohm was a member of the Wisconsin State Assembly during the 1895 session. A native of Milwaukee, Wisconsin, Notbohm represented the 7th District of Milwaukee County, Wisconsin. He was a Republican.

References

External links
The Political Graveyard

Politicians from Milwaukee
Year of birth missing
Year of death missing
Republican Party members of the Wisconsin State Assembly